The French National Olympic and Sports Committee (CNOSF) is the National Olympic Committee of France. It is responsible for France's participation in the Olympic Games, as well as for all of France's overseas departments and territories except French Polynesia.

History

The French Olympic Committee was established in 1894 in Paris. In 1972, by the merging with the National Sports Committee, has changed its name to the French National Olympic and Sports Committee.

List of presidents
This is following list of presidents:

Presidents of French Olympic Committee 

Presidents of National Sports Committee

Presidents of French National Olympic and Sports Committee

Member federations
The French National Federations are the organizations that coordinate all aspects of their individual sports. They are responsible for training, competition and development of their sports. There are currently 33 Olympic Summer and three Winter Sport Federations in France.

See also
 France at the Olympics

External links
 Official website
 espritbleu.franceolympique.com – Esprit Bleu, Équipe de France (Blue Spirit, Team of France)
 cnosf.franceolympique.com – Site Institutionnel (Institutional website)
 international.franceolympique.com – International

National Olympic Committees
Comm
Oly
1894 establishments in France
Sports organizations established in 1894